The Capt. Edward Fuller Farm is a historic farmstead at 59-71 North Street in Newton, Massachusetts.  The original farmhouse is at #59, and the barn, now converted to a house, is at #71.  The house is estimated to have been built c. 1775, possibly using materials from an even older structure; the barn is estimated to have been built in 1800.  The house was original  stories, and was raised to its present  in the 1840s.  The barn was converted to residential use c. 1950.  The house was probably built by Edward Fuller, whose great-grandfather was one of the first settlers of the area.

The properties were listed on the National Register of Historic Places in 1986.

See also
 National Register of Historic Places listings in Newton, Massachusetts

References

National Register of Historic Places in Newton, Massachusetts
Farms on the National Register of Historic Places in Massachusetts
Federal architecture in Massachusetts
Houses completed in 1775
Buildings and structures in Newton, Massachusetts